The 2003–04 NBA season was the Wizards 43rd season in the National Basketball Association, and their 31st season in the city of Washington, D.C. With All-Star guard Michael Jordan retired for good and Doug Collins fired as head coach, the Wizards hired Eddie Jordan, and signed free agent and last year's Most Improved Player Gilbert Arenas during the offseason. Under Jordan, the Wizards showed signs early into the season as they won their first game against the Chicago Bulls 99–74, and held the Toronto Raptors to 60 points in a 26-point margin win, while winning three of their first five games. However, with team captain Jerry Stackhouse playing just 26 games due to knee injuries, the Wizards played mediocre basketball all season finishing sixth in the Atlantic Division with a disappointing 25–57 record, missing the playoffs for the seventh straight season. Following the season, Stackhouse was traded to the Dallas Mavericks, and Christian Laettner signed as a free agent with the Miami Heat.

Offseason

Draft picks

Roster

Regular season

Season standings

Notes
 z, y – division champions
 x – clinched playoff spot

Record vs. opponents

Game log

Player statistics

Season

Awards and records
 Jarvis Hayes, NBA All-Rookie Team 2nd Team

Transactions

References

See also
 2003-04 NBA season

Washington Wizards seasons
Wash
Wash